The Wibault 368 was a single-engined aircraft built to contend for a French government prize for a long-range aircraft using a diesel engine in the late 1930s.

Specifications (variant specified)

References

Bibliography

Wib 368
Single-engined tractor aircraft
Low-wing aircraft
Aircraft first flown in 1937